Alitalia Flight 112 was a scheduled flight from Leonardo da Vinci Airport, in Rome, Italy, to Palermo International Airport in Palermo, Italy, with 115 on board. Investigators believe that the crew had 3 miles visibility and did not adhere to the established vectors issued by air traffic control. It remains the deadliest single-aircraft disaster in Italy, and the second-deadliest behind the Linate Airport disaster in 2001. The incident is the worst in Alitalia's history.

A memorial has been erected at the site of the crash.

The accident 

On 5 May 1972, the aircraft I-DIWB of Alitalia (a Douglas DC-8-43) started the flight AZ 112 from Rome to Palermo, taking off 36 minutes late. Captain Roberto Bartoli was in charge of the radio assistance, while First Officer Bruno Dini flew the aircraft. The times and locations have been precisely recovered from the recorder of Rome Control, which had a time recorder, while Palermo Approach did not.

Part of the debris and bodies of the victims rolled on the mountain side (Carini side) from where the kerosene fire was witnessed. The wreckage was strewn across a  area, so wide it took rescue teams three hours to reach it. Later on, some witnesses at Carini said that they had seen the aircraft on fire before the crash.

Of the 115 passengers and crew, almost all were Italian; the only known foreigners aboard were a Belgian stewardess, three British people and a French couple. The travellers were, for the most part, returning home to vote in the Italian national elections that weekend. Among the victims of the crash were the noted film director Franco Indovina and Cestino Vycpalek, the son of the then-coach of the Juventus team, Čestmír Vycpalek.

The crash occurred on the 26th anniversary of Alitalia, which started operations with a single Fiat G.12 on loan from the Italian air force.

After the accident 

The trial represented the official version of events.  The trial targeted the pilots for not following the guidelines of the flight controllers. The reason for the crash was labeled as 'pilot error' and a controlled flight into terrain (CFIT) (describes an unintentional crash by an airworthy aircraft into the ground).

There is another version of the accident held by some of the victims’ relatives. Mrs. Maria Eleonora Fais, sister of Angela Fais, who died in that plane, was able to find, after many years, the report of the Vice-Chief of Police Giuseppe Peri that says that the plane exploded because of a bombing. Peri accuses an alliance of people having ties with the Mafia and with a subversive group from the Right with the responsibility for this bombing. Three days after the accident the political elections would be held in which a strong rise of the Right was foreseen. The National Association of Italian Pilots (ANPAC) sided with the pilots, refusing the possibility of a mistake due to their long experience and because the accusation of an intoxication to prove their "exclusive" responsibility had been denied. Other problems have been raised on the bad position of the airport of Punta Raisi. (On the position of the airport, see the accusations raised by Giuseppe Impastato)

There is an urban legend that in the crash of Montagna Longa a mythical first wife or partner of the songwriter Francesco De Gregori found her death. But it is only an unfounded conjecture deducted from the words of the song Buonanotte Fiorellino, which seems to make allusion to the tragedy. In reality, the song is inspired by "Winterlude" of Bob Dylan.

See also
 List of accidents and incidents involving commercial aircraft

Notes

Bibliography 
 Antonio Bordoni. "Piloti malati – Quando il pilota non-scende dall'aereo". Roma, Travel Factory S.r.l., Dicembre 2008.
 Giorgio De Stefani. "Navigazione Aerea Manuale Giuridico Amministrativo". Roma, Istituto Poligrafico e Zecca dello Stato, 1985.
 Edoardo Rebulla. "Sogni d'acqua". Sellerio Editore Palermo.
 Renato Azzinnari e Leone Zingales. "Anni difficili". Casa Editrice Istituto Gramsci Siciliano.

External links 
 
 Air disaster Flight Alitalia AZ 112 

Airliner accidents and incidents involving controlled flight into terrain
Airliner accidents and incidents caused by pilot error
Aviation accidents and incidents in Italy
Accidents and incidents involving the Douglas DC-8
Aviation accidents and incidents in 1972
1972 in Italy
112
May 1972 events in Europe